Jashwant Rao Chitambar (5 September 1879 – 4 September 1940) was the first Indian bishop of the Methodist Episcopal Church of North and South India, elected in 1930.

Early life
Chitambar was born in Allahabad, United Provinces, India.  He was the son of native preacher Rajaram Chitambar, who was a converted Mahratta Brahmin, one of the first converts to Christianity as a result of missionary work in western India.  Both of Chitambar's parents were of the high caste Indians, who converted to Christianity.

Ordained ministry
Chitambar was accepted into the membership of the North India Annual Conference in 1907.  He became a Hindustani pastor, district superintendent, and educator.  He was the first Indian delegate to General Conference.  One of the founders of the National Missionary Society of India, Chitambar was a delegate to the World's Missionary Conference in Edinburgh, Scotland, in 1910.

Episcopal ministry
He was elected to the episcopacy of the M.E. Church by the Central Conference of Southern Asia in 1930.  His election made him the first native Protestant bishop.  He became ill on his return from the General Conference of 1940, and he died 4 September 1940 in Jubbulpore, India.  He was buried in Jubbulpore.

Selected works
John Wesley, the Man Who Did Exploits, in God's Heroes Our Examples, 1914.
Mahatma Gandhi:  His Life, Work and Influence, 1933.
Translation of Christian Hymns.
Member of committee that revised "The Standard Hindustani Dictionary."
He was first Indian Native Bishop in MEC

Further reading
 Badley, Brenton T. The Making of a Bishop: The Life of Bishop Jashwant Chitambar (Lucknow, India: Lucknow Publishing House, 1942).
 Leete, Frederick DeLand, Methodist Bishops.  Nashville, The Methodist Publishing House, 1948.
 Locke, Russ M. "A Methodist Family In India: A History Of I. Amar Chitambar and Family." (Doctor of Ministry thesis, Claremont School Of Theology, Proquest Dissertations Publishing, 1978. 781534 online, pp. 40–54 on Jashwant Rao Chitambar.
 Pickett, J. Waskom. The Methodist Church in India. (1939).

See also
List of bishops of the United Methodist Church

References

1879 births
1940 deaths
Bishops of the Methodist Episcopal Church
Translators from English
Translators to Hindustani
Indian Methodists
20th-century Indian biographers
Indian United Methodist bishops
English-language writers from India
Hindustani-language writers
Burials in India
20th-century Methodist bishops
19th-century Indian translators
20th-century Indian translators